Charron is a commune in the Charente-Maritime department in the Nouvelle-Aquitaine region in southwestern France. It is situated at the outflow of the Sèvre Niortaise into the Atlantic Ocean.

Population

See also
 Communes of the Charente-Maritime department

References

External links
 

Communes of Charente-Maritime
Arrondissement of La Rochelle
Canton of Marans
Charente-Maritime communes articles needing translation from French Wikipedia